Hubertus Castle is a 1973 German drama film directed by Harald Reinl and starring Robert Hoffmann, Carl Lange and Karlheinz Böhm. It is an adaptation of the 1895 novel Hubertus Castle by Ludwig Ganghofer.

Cast

References

Bibliography

External links

1973 films
1973 drama films
German drama films
1970s German-language films
Films based on works by Ludwig Ganghofer
Films based on German novels
Films directed by Harald Reinl
West German films
Films about hunters
Remakes of German films
Films set in Bavaria
Films set in the Alps
Films set in castles
Constantin Film films
1970s German films